Noah Warren is a Canadian-American poet and 2015 winner of the Yale Series of Younger Poets Competition. Yale University Press published his collection The Destroyer in the Glass in 2016.

Biography 
Warren was born in Nova Scotia, Canada and grew up in Charlestown, Rhode Island. He attended Yale University. He is a former Stegner Fellow at Stanford University.

Works 
 The Destroyer in the Glass, New Haven, Connecticut; London: Yale University Press, 2016. , 
 The Complete Stories, Port Townsend, Washington: Copper Canyon Press, 2021.

References 

American male poets
Living people
21st-century American poets
Writers from Nova Scotia
Poets from Rhode Island
People from Washington County, Rhode Island
Yale University alumni
Stegner Fellows
Canadian emigrants to the United States
Yale Younger Poets winners
21st-century American male writers
Year of birth missing (living people)